The 2005–06 season was Burnley's 6th season in the second tier of English football. They were managed by Steve Cotterill in his second full season since he replaced Stan Ternent at the beginning of the 2004–05 season.

Appearances and goals
	
	
	
	
	

	
	

	
	
	
	
	

	

|}

Transfers

In

Out

Matches

Championship

Final league position

League Cup

FA Cup

References

Burnley F.C. seasons
Burnley